Dittany is a common name for several species of plants and may refer to:

 Dictamnus albus (dittany)
Ballota pseudodictamnus (false dittany)
 Origanum dictamnus (dittany of Crete, Cretan dittany)
 Cunila origanoides (dittany, American dittany)